Am I Black Enough for You? may refer to:

 Am I Black Enough for You? (album), an album by Schoolly D
 "Am I Black Enough for You?" (song), a 1972 song by Billy Paul